Le secret du Chevalier d'Éon is a 1959 French-Italian film. It stars Andrée Debar and Gabriele Ferzetti. It is loosely based on the life of Chevalier d'Éon, although it portrays them as a woman masquerading as a man, rather than a person who was biologically male but presenting as a woman, as was the case for the latter part of their life.

References

External links

1959 films
1959 adventure films
French adventure films
Italian adventure films
1950s French-language films
Films directed by Jacqueline Audry
Films set in the 18th century
Films set in France
Films set in Russia
Cross-dressing in film
1950s Italian films
1950s French films